Norman Earle "Norm" Willey (August 22, 1927 – August 18, 2011) was an American football defensive lineman in the National Football League for the Philadelphia Eagles.  He went to two Pro Bowls during his eight-year career and was credited with an unofficial 17 sacks in one game which would be an NFL record today.  Willey played college football at Marshall University and was drafted in the thirteenth round of the 1950 NFL Draft. Willey went on after his NFL career to teach physical education and coach football at Pennsville Memorial High School in Pennsville Township, New Jersey; the Norm Willey Boot trophy is awarded annually to the winner of annual football game between Pennsville and Penns Grove High School.

In 2003, he was elected into the Marshall University Athletics Hall of Fame for his career in football and basketball.

Wiley died on August 18, 2011, aged 83, only four days short of his 84th birthday.

In remembrance of Willey, the Pennsville Memorial High School football team represented his initials on each of their helmets during the 2011 season.

References

1927 births
2011 deaths
American football defensive ends
Marshall Thundering Herd football players
Marshall Thundering Herd men's basketball players
Philadelphia Eagles players
Eastern Conference Pro Bowl players
Place of death missing
People from Salem County, New Jersey
People from Wetzel County, West Virginia
Pennsville Memorial High School alumni
American men's basketball players